2005–06 Croatian First League was the 16th season of the Croatian handball league since its independence and the fifth season of the First League format.

League table and results

First phase

Group A

Group B

Second phase

Championship play-offs 
Intermediate results from the first part are transferred, and the clubs play two more games with teams from the same group and four with teams from the second group of the first part of the championship (16 in total, in the table of 20 matches).

Relegation play-offs 
Play-offs to stay in the First league or to be demoted to the Second League for teams from 7 to 16 place.

Final standings

Sources 
 Jurica Gizdić: "RK Solin - 50 godina rukometa u Solinu", Solin, 2006., str. 120-122
 RK Zamet - B grupa
 RK Zamet - liga za prvaka
 European Handball Federation

References

2005-06
handball
handball
Croatia